Primitive Technology is a YouTube channel run by John Plant. Based in Far North Queensland in the Australian state of Queensland, the series demonstrates the process of making tools and buildings using only materials found in the wild. Created in May 2015, the channel has gained over 10 million subscribers and over 1.05 billion views as of October 2022.

Background
Plant describes his subject as a hobby, and he "lives in a modern house and eats modern food". He stated in a comment on a January 2018 video that he owns the land on which he films the videos. He states on his website that he has no Aboriginal ancestry and has not received military training.

In a correspondence with Michelle Castillo of CNBC in 2018, Plant stated that he was in his mid 30s. He also said he went to university and received a Bachelor of Science degree but "didn't do anything with it", and instead mowed lawns for a living while going out into the bush in his spare time to practice his hobby. He stated his affinity for subsisting off of nature began at a young age: at 11, he would make huts by a creek behind his house using only natural materials.

Description
Each video guides viewers through the progress of one or more projects demonstrating the techniques and methods he uses to create tools or buildings. As he explains on his blog, he builds "completely from scratch using no modern tools or materials", only using what he can source from his natural environment, such as plant materials, clay, soil, and stones. Episodes of the series contain no speaking, and only minimal ambient sound. Text descriptions of actions on-screen appear in the closed-caption feature. During the videos he does not wear any clothing except cargo shorts.

History

Blog
In June 2015, Plant created the Primitive Technology blog on WordPress. That blog was a primary source of his videos through November 2018 when he posted the "Iron Prills" video, whereupon Plant moved exclusively to YouTube.

YouTube channel
Plant created the Primitive Technology channel in May 2015. The first video was uploaded on 1 May 2015. Since that time, each of his videos has garnered millions of views. The channel amassed 5.4 million subscribers and 350 million views by September 2017, increasing to 8.7 million subscribers and 615 million views by September 2018. As of December 2021, the channel has over 10.3 million subscribers and over 994 million views.

For the first two years of the channel's existence, the man in the videos remained anonymous. In June 2017, he identified himself as John Plant when he complained to Facebook that his videos were being stolen as a result of people reposting them on the website, and that the practice had cost him thousands of Australian dollars.

Book
Plant has authored the 192 page, illustrated, hardcover book Primitive Technology: A survivalist's guide to building tools, shelters, and more in the wild, published by Clarkson Potter on October 29, 2019. The book is "a practical guide to building huts and tools using only natural materials from the wild" containing "50 projects with step-by-step instructions on how to make tools, weapons, shelters, pottery, clothing, and more".

Hiatus and return to YouTube
After a video on December 13, 2019, no new videos were uploaded to Primitive Technology in the usual timeframe. On May 28, 2020, a post explaining the hiatus was posted to a Reddit community maintained by fans of the Primitive Technology channel. The post stated that Plant was taking a break from YouTube because he was working on a project for a cable network. Another post on February 8, 2021, explained that Plant shot a pilot episode for the project but the network wanted to change the format, and that Plant could not share any more information. In his free time, Plant was still recording new material, but he did not want to post it if he deemed it of not high enough quality. On 2 March 2022, Plant posted his first video in over two years, titled Primitive Technology: Thatched Workshop. He continues to upload videos monthly.

References

External links
Official website

Australian YouTubers
Viral videos
YouTube original programming
People from Queensland